Penicillium chermesinum is an anamorph fungus species of the genus of Penicillium which was isolated from soil from Nova Scotia in Canada.Penicillium chermesinum produces plastatin, luteosporin, xanthomegnin, azaphilones, p-terphenyls and costaclavine.

See also
List of Penicillium species

Further reading

References

chermesinum
Fungi described in 1923